Admiralty is the eastern extension of the central business district (adjacent to, but separate from, Central) on the Hong Kong Island of Hong Kong. It is located on the eastern end of the Central and Western District, bordered by Wan Chai to the east and Victoria Harbour to the north.

The name of Admiralty refers to the former Admiralty Dock in the area which housed a naval dockyard. The dock was later demolished when land was reclaimed and developed northward as the naval base . The Chinese name, Kam Chung (金鐘), lit. "Golden Bell", refers to a gold-coloured bell that was used for timekeeping at Wellington Barracks.

History
The area was developed as a military area by the British military in the 19th century. They built the Wellington Barracks, Murray Barracks, Victoria Barracks and Admiralty Dock at the site. Following the urbanisation of the north shore of Hong Kong Island, the military area split the urban area. The Hong Kong Government tried many times to get the land from the British military to connect the two urban areas, but the military refused. It was not until the 1970s that the land was gradually returned to government and changed to commercial buildings and gardens.

The Admiralty station of the MTR was built on the former site of the Hong Kong dockyards which was built in 1878 and demolished in the 1970s. After its completion, the area became increasingly known as Admiralty, rather than Central.

During the 2014 Hong Kong protests (aka "Umbrella Revolution"), substantial tracts of the area were occupied by suffragists, who dubbed it Umbrella Square.

Admiralty was also a focal point in the 2019 Hong Kong extradition law protests.

Features
Buildings in Admiralty consist primarily of office buildings, government buildings, shopping malls and hotels. There are also several parks in the area: Hong Kong Park, Tamar Park and Harcourt Garden.

The main development of the area in recent years has been the development of the Tamar site into the Central Government Complex, which started operating in 2011. Facing Victoria Harbour, the complex houses the Office of the Chief Executive, the Legislative Council Complex and the Central Government Offices.

As one of the main financial areas in Hong Kong, there are plenty of Grade-A commercial buildings in Admiralty including:
 Admiralty Centre
 Asia Society Hong Kong Centre, housed in the former Former Explosive Magazine of the Victoria Barracks
 Bank of America Tower
 British Consulate General Hong Kong
 Chinese People's Liberation Army Forces Hong Kong Building
 CITIC Tower
Cheung Kong Centre II 
 Far East Finance Centre
 Fairmont House
 High Court Building
 Lippo Centre, which houses the Taipei Economic and Cultural Office
 Pacific Place, a complex featuring a shopping mall, several hotels and office towers, that opened in Admiralty in phases between 1988 and 1991. The complex is connected to the MTR Admiralty station via an underground walkway. A later phase, Three Pacific Place, is located in Wan Chai
 Queensway Government Offices
 Queensway Plaza, a shopping centre located above Admiralty station
 United Centre

Transport
Queensway and Harcourt Road are the major roads in the area. Both roads run from west to east and connect Central to Wan Chai. Other streets include Rodney Street and Tim Mei Avenue. Trams are running across Admiralty along Queensway. Most of the buildings of the area are connected through the Central Elevated Walkway, an extensive footbridge network which extends to the western part of Central.

The area is served by the peaktram and Admiralty station of the MTR. It is an interchange station between Island line, Tsuen Wan line, South Island line and East Rail line. The Admiralty (East) Public Transport Interchange, a major bus terminus, is located above the station.

Economy

Major corporations headquartered in Admiralty include:
 Everbright International, in the

See also
 List of buildings, sites and areas in Hong Kong
 Central and Wan Chai Reclamation

References

 
Restricted areas of Hong Kong red public minibus